Indirect rule was a system of governance used by the British and others to control parts of their colonial empires, particularly in Africa and Asia, which was done through pre-existing indigenous power structures. Indirect rule was used by various colonial rulers: the French in Algeria and Tunisia, the Dutch in the East Indies, the Portuguese in Angola and Mozambique and the Belgians in Rwanda and Burundi. These dependencies were often called "protectorates" or "trucial states". By this system, the day-to-day government and administration of areas both small and large were left in the hands of traditional rulers, who gained prestige and the stability and protection afforded by the Pax Britannica (in the case of British territories), at the cost of losing control of their external affairs, and often of taxation, communications, and other matters, usually with a small number of European "advisors" effectively overseeing the government of large numbers of people spread over extensive areas.

British Empire
Some British colonies were ruled directly by the Colonial Office in London, while others were ruled indirectly through local rulers who are supervised behind the scenes by British advisors. In 1890 Zanzibar became a protectorate (not a colony) of Britain. British Prime Minister Salisbury explained his position:
The condition of a protected dependency is more acceptable to the half civilized races, and more suitable for them than direct dominion. It is cheaper, simpler, less wounding to their self-esteem, gives them more career as public officials, and spares of unnecessary contact with white men.

The Princely states of India were also ruled indirectly, with the Indian territories ruled indirectly experiencing similar effects to those in Africa that experienced indirect rule. The same went for many of the West African holdings of the British and French empires.

In Africa
The ideological underpinnings, as well as the practical application, of 'indirect rule' in Uganda and Nigeria is usually traced to the work of Frederick Lugard, the High Commissioner of the Protectorate of Northern Nigeria from 1899 to 1906.
Indirect rule was by no means a new idea at the time since it had been in use in ruling empires throughout history. For instance, in addition to India and Uganda, it had been practiced in the Songhai and Ashanti Empires.

In the lands of the Sokoto Caliphate, conquered by the British at the turn of the century, Lugard instituted a system whereby external, military, and tax control was operated by the British, while most every other aspect of life was left to local pre-conquest indigenous aristocracies who may have sided with the British during or after their conquest. The theory behind this solution to a very practical problem (a problem referred to as 'The Native Problem' by Mahmood Mamdani in his work Citizen and Subject) of control by a tiny group of foreigners of huge populations is laid out in Lugard's influential work, The Dual Mandate in British Tropical Africa. Lugard copied the numerous empires before his time who had created and developed the indirect rule system.

According to Lugard, Indirect Rule was a political doctrine which held that the Europeans and Africans were culturally different to this extent, Africans had to be ruled through the Africans own institution.
To achieve this objective:
 Chiefs and or Royalty continued to exercise their traditional powers over their subjects;
 Chiefs were appointed for areas with no chiefs; and
 Aspects of traditional government repugnant to “European ideas of what constituted government were modified.” e.g. the abolition of human sacrifice.

It has been pointed out that the British were not prepared to pay for colonial administration, though interested in economically benefiting from their new colonies; neither aspect had the British enough resources to finance it. This economic question coupled with the shortage of or lack of European personnel in Africa at the time convinced the British that it would be cheaper to use the traditional institutions to achieve the same objective. The nature and operation of indirect rule in Northern Nigerian, amply confirm these contentions. When Lugard and his men conquered the Sokoto Caliphate of Northern Nigeria, in early twentieth century, his limited resources in terms of men and money, made it impracticable for him to rule the vast territory. Fortunately for him, however, the Sokoto Caliphate already possessed a highly developed and efficient system of administration headed by emirs, with the Sultan of Sokoto as the supreme head. The hierarchical nature of the political structure was ideal for the system of indirect rule because the British could control the emirs and the emirs in turn could control their people.

In the mid-1920s, the British implemented a system of indirect rule in Tanzania.

Practical implementation

Indirect rule was cheaper and easier for the European powers and, in particular, it required fewer administrators, but had a number of problems. In many cases, European authorities empowered local traditional leaders, as in the case of the monarchy of Uganda, but if no suitable leader could be found (in the traditional Western sense of the term), the Europeans would simply choose local rulers to suit them. This was the case in Kenya and Southern Nigeria, and the new leaders, often called "warrant chiefs", were not always supported by the local population. The European ruling classes also often chose local leaders with similar traits to their own, despite these traits not being suited to native leadership. Many were conservative elders, and thus indirect rule fostered a conservative outlook among the indigenous population and marginalised the young intelligentsia. Written laws, which replaced oral laws, were less flexible to the changing social nature, old customs of retribution and justice were removed or banned, and the removal of more violent punishments in some areas led to an increase in crime. Furthermore, leaders empowered by the governments of European powers were often not familiar with their new tasks, such as recruitment and tax.

Interpretations
From the early 20th century, French and British writers helped establish a dichotomy between British indirect rule, exemplified by the Indian princely states and by Lugard's writings on the administration of northern Nigeria, and French colonial direct rule. As with British theorists, French colonial officials like Félix Eboué or Robert Delavignette wrote and argued throughout the first half of the 20th century for a distinct French style of rule that was centralized, uniform, and aimed at assimilating colonial subjects into the French polity. French rule, sometimes labeled Jacobin, was said in these writings to be based on the twin ideologies of the centralized unitary French government of the Metropole, with the French colonial ideology of Assimilation. Colonial Assimilation argued that French law and citizenship was based on universal values that came from the French Revolution. Mirroring French domestic citizenship law, French colonial law allowed for anyone who could prove themselves culturally French (the "Évolués") to become equal French citizens. In French West Africa, only parts of the Senegalese "Four Communes" ever extended French citizenship outside a few educated African elite.

While making more subtle distinctions, this model of direct versus indirect rule was dominant in academia from the 1930s until the 1970s.

Academics since the 1970s have problematised the Direct versus Indirect Rule dichotomy, arguing the systems were in practice intermingled in both British and French colonial governance, and that the perception of indirect rule was sometimes promoted to justify quite direct rule structures.

Mahmood Mamdani and other academics have discussed extensively how both direct and indirect rule were attempts to implement identical goals of foreign rule, but how the "indirect" strategy helped to create ethnic tensions within ruled societies which persist in hostile communal relations and dysfunctional strategies of government. Mamdani himself famously described indirect rule as "decentralised despotism".

Some political scientists have even expanded the debate on how direct versus indirect rule experiences continue to affect contemporary governance into how governments which have never experienced being under colonial rule function.

See also

Bussa revolt – a 1915 uprising against indirect rule in Northern Nigeria
Direct colonial rule
Analysis of Western European colonialism and colonization
Neocolonialism

References

Sources and references
 Michael Crowder. Indirect Rule: French and British Style. Africa: Journal of the International African Institute, Vol. 34, No. 3. (Jul., 1964), pp. 197–205.
 Paul Rich . The Origins of Apartheid Ideology: The Case of Ernest Stubbs and Transvaal Native Administration, c.1902-1932. African Affairs, Vol. 79, No. 315. (Apr., 1980), pp. 171–194.
Omipidan Teslim
Indirect Rule in Nigeria
OldNaija
 H. F. Morris . A History of the Adoption of Codes of Criminal Law and Procedure in British Colonial Africa, 1876–1935. Journal of African Law, Vol. 18, No. 1, Criminal Law and Criminology. (Spring, 1974), pp. 6–23.
 Jonathan Derrick. The 'Native Clerk' in Colonial West Africa. African Affairs, Vol. 82, No. 326. (Jan., 1983), pp. 61–74.
 Diana Wylie. Confrontation over Kenya: The Colonial Office and Its Critics 1918–1940. The Journal of African History, Vol. 18, No. 3. (1977), pp. 427–447.
 P. A. Brunt . Empires: Reflections on British and Roman Imperialism. Comparative Studies in Society and History, Vol. 7, No. 3. (Apr., 1965), pp. 267–288.
 R. O. Collins and J. M. Burns. A History of Sub-Saharan Africa, Cambridge, 2007.

Period writings
 Harold Nicolson. The Colonial Problem. International Affairs, Vol. 17, No. 1. (Jan. - Feb., 1938), pp. 32–50.
 W. E. Rappard . The Practical Working of the Mandates System. Journal of the British Institute of International Affairs, Vol. 4, No. 5. (Sep., 1925), pp. 205–226.
 Jan Smuts. Native Policy in Africa. Journal of the Royal African Society, Vol. 29, No. 115. (Apr., 1930), pp. 248–268.
 Ralph J. Bunche . French and British Imperialism in West Africa. The Journal of Negro History, Vol. 21, No. 1. (Jan., 1936), pp. 31–46.

Governance of the British Empire
History of European colonialism
French colonels